Haramayn (from , dual form of haram, meaning "The Two Sanctuaries"), is the traditional Islamic appellation of the two holiest cities of Islam, Mecca and Medina. It may also refer to:

Jerusalem and Hebron during the Mamluk and Ottoman eras, echoing their status as holy sites for Palestinian Muslims
Imam al-Haramayn (1028–1085 CE), Sunni Shafi'i hadith and Kalam scholar
al-Haramain Foundation (or al-Haramayn Foundation), a charity foundation based in Saudi Arabia, alleged by the U.S. Department of the Treasury to have "direct links" with Osama bin Laden

Haramain high-speed railway, Saudi Arabia's high-speed rail system linking Mecca and Medina.
Bayn al-Haramayn, the area between the Imam Husayn shrine and al-Abbas mosque, in Karbala

See also 
 Custodian of the Two Holy Mosques